Bolitoglossa is a genus of lungless salamanders, also called mushroom-tongued salamanders, tropical climbing salamanders, or web-footed salamanders, in the family Plethodontidae. Their range is between northern Mexico through Central America to Colombia, Venezuela, Ecuador, Peru, northeastern Brazil, and central Bolivia. Neotropical salamanders of the Bolitoglossa make up the largest genus in the order Caudata, consisting of approximately one-fifth of all known species of salamanders.  Adult salamanders range anywhere from 45mm to 200mm in length depending on their specific species. They are notorious for their ability to project their tongue at prey items, as indicated from their name. They are also known for their webbed feet, having significantly more webbing than any other species outside their genus with the exception of the cave-dwelling Mexican bolitoglossine Chiropterotriton magnipes. Although webbed feet are a common characteristic of these salamanders, only about half of the species in this genus contain webbed feet.

Characteristics

Hand and foot morphology
Hand and foot morphology is strikingly diverse in an otherwise morphologically uniform group.  While just under half of these species contain webbing between their fingers and toes, the remaining species experience little to no webbing and undergo elongation of their fingers and toes throughout development.  Ultimately, the variation of foot morphology within this genus is primarily due to natural selection.  Derived characteristics correspond to arboreal vs. terrestrial salamanders.
Webbed fingers – natural selection to improve terrestrial movement through water.
Elongated fingers – natural selection of increased suction efficiency, favoring a larger surface area of the foot.  This also selects for a decreased body size, enabling the salamander to cling trees more easily.

Tail autotomy
Tail autotomy refers to the salamanders’ ability to release or lose their tail if necessary.  This is a common characteristic of nearly all salamanders and lizards. (See autotomy).  It is particularly helpful to the salamander in escaping attacks from its predators.  Once the tail has been lost, it can regenerate one time.  After this regeneration, the tail is incapable of separation with regeneration.

Poison
Bolitoglossa rostrata and B. subpalmata are two rare examples of poisonous salamanders within their genus.  The poison is secreted through their skin as an antipredator mechanism.  It is particularly toxic to certain snake species, rendering them immobile and unresponsive to external stimuli upon initial contact.  The common defense tactic of these two species is to remain still in the presence of the snake until it makes initial contact (usually by the flickering of its tongue), and then run away as the paralytic poison begins to take effect in the snake.

Evolution

Natural selection
Tropical adaptation of the Bolitoglossa is thought to have evolved from North American plethodontids.  Natural selection is responsible for morphological changes shifting from those supporting temperate environments to those supporting tropical environments such as Panama and Costa Rica.
Natural selection is thought to have resulted in genetic changes from physical adaptation.  The main differences that have developed from natural selection affect the skull and bones of the feet in these salamanders.  Due to these primary changes, secondary changes are believed to have followed, including:
Body size
Additional ossification of bones 
Webbing
Ear structure
Phylogeny of this genus is partially dependent on its variations in bone structure due to the effects of natural selection over a long period of time.

Hybridization
The first documented case of hybridization in tropical salamanders occurred between B. frankini and B. resplendens.  This hybridization has taken a pervasive effect on the morphology of B. resplendens, whereas B. frankini seemed to maintain its same physical structure.

Taxonomy

Derived characteristics of the genus Bolitoglossa has led to their classification based on this specific list of characters:
Tongue and hypobranchial apparatus
Epibranchial Number
embryos having a single epibranchial
Tail Autotomy
Brain stem motor control
Bone structure of Jaws, Cranial, and inner ear
Chromosome number
diploid number of chromosomes is 26
Development

Classification of this genus is primarily accomplished through analysis of the salamanders’ DNA.  This has proven to be the most effective and accurate way of classifying this genus.

Species
As of September 2022, there are 137 species assigned to this genus, including the species listed below.

References

External links 

  [web application]. 2008. Berkeley, California: Bolitoglossa. AmphibiaWeb, available at http://amphibiaweb.org/. (Accessed: 29 July 2008).

 
Amphibian genera
Amphibians of North America
Amphibians of South America
Taxa named by André Marie Constant Duméril
Taxa named by Gabriel Bibron
Taxa named by Auguste Duméril
Taxonomy articles created by Polbot